Somalia competed at the Paralympic Games for the first time in 2016, at the Summer Paralympics in Rio de Janeiro, Brazil. It sent one wheelchair athlete to compete in track and field events.
Somalia has never taken part in the Winter Paralympic Games, and no athlete from this country has ever won a medal.

Full results for Somalia at the Paralympics

See also
 Somalia at the Olympics

References

 
Sport in Somalia